is a Japanese retired judoka. He won a silver medal at the 2004 Summer Paralympics. He was coached by Takio Ushikubo.

Personal life
He is married to goalball player Mieko Kato (née Asai). The couple lived in Asaka, Saitama.

References 

Paralympic silver medalists for Japan
Judoka at the 2004 Summer Paralympics
Judoka at the 2012 Summer Paralympics
1978 births
Living people
Medalists at the 2004 Summer Paralympics
Sportspeople from Saitama Prefecture
Paralympic judoka of Japan
Japanese male judoka
University of Tsukuba alumni
Paralympic medalists in judo
20th-century Japanese people
21st-century Japanese people